Verkhnenikolskoye is a rural locality (a selo) in Khokholskoye Urban Settlement, Khokholsky District, Voronezh Oblast, Russia. The population was 83 as of 2010. There are 3 streets.

Geography 
Verkhnenikolskoye is located 17 km southwest of Khokholsky (the district's administrative centre) by road. Nizhneye Turovo is the nearest rural locality.

References 

Rural localities in Khokholsky District